The 2017 Stockholm FIM Speedway Grand Prix was the tenth race of the 2017 Speedway Grand Prix season. It took place on September 22 at the Friends Arena in Stockholm, Sweden.

Riders 
First reserve Peter Kildemand replaced Greg Hancock, second reserve Martin Smolinski replaced Nicki Pedersen and third reserve Max Fricke replaced Niels-Kristian Iversen. The Speedway Grand Prix Commission also nominated Kim Nilsson as the wild card, and Jacob Thorssell and Filip Hjelmland both as Track Reserves.

Results 
The Grand Prix was won by Slovenia's Matej Žagar, who beat Bartosz Zmarzlik, Jason Doyle and Peter Kildemand in the final. It was Zagar's second successive Grand Prix win after finishing first in Germany the round before. Doyle, who equalled the record number of final appearances in one season with nine, initially top scored in the qualifying heats, however third place saw him move 22 points clear of Patryk Dudek, who failed to make the semi-finals.

Heat details

Intermediate classification

References

See also 
 Motorcycle speedway

Sweden
Speedway Grand Prix
2017 in Swedish motorsport
Speedway Grand Prix of Scandinavia